Piñones may refer to:

 The seeds of the tree genus Araucaria
 Piñones State Forest, Puerto Rico
 Battle of Puerto de Piñones, a battle of the War of Mexican Independence
 Pablo Piñones Arce (born 1981), Swedish footballer